Lotbinière (later known as Lotbinière—L'Érable) was a federal electoral district in Quebec, Canada, that was represented in the House of Commons of Canada from 1867 to 2004.

It was created by the British North America Act of 1867. It was renamed "Lotbinière—L'Érable" in 2000, and was abolished in 2003 when it was redistributed between Lotbinière—Chutes-de-la-Chaudière, Mégantic—L'Érable, Richelieu and Richmond—Arthabaska ridings.

Geography

It consisted initially of the County of Lotbinière.

In 1876, the Parish of St. Sévérin was transferred to the County of Beauce for the purposes of representation in the House of Commons.

In 1924, it was defined again as consisting of the County of Lotbinière.

In 1933, the following areas were added:
 from the county of Nicolet: the municipalities of Lemieux, St-Pierre Les-Becquets, Ste-Cécile-de-Lévrard, Ste-Sophie-de-Lévrard, Ste-Marie-de-Blandford, St-Joseph-de-Blandford and the village of Manseau;
 from the county of Lévis: the municipalities of St-Etienne-de-Lauzon, St-Lambert-de-Lauzon, St-Nicholas, St-Nicholas Sud, the village of St-Rédempteur;
 from the county of Mégantic: the village of Lyster and the municipalities of Ste-Anastasie-de-Nelson, Nelson, Leeds, Leeds East, St-Jacques-de-Leeds;
 from  the county of Beauce: the municipalities of St-Elzéar and St-Séverin.

In 1947, it was defined as consisting of:
 the county of Lotbinière;
 in the county of Nicolet: the municipalities of Lemieux, St. Pierre-les-Becquets, Ste. Cécile-de-Lévrard, Ste-Sophie-de-Lévrard, Ste. Marie de-Blandford, St. Joseph-de-Blandford and the villages of Manseau and Les Becquets;
 in the county of Mégantic: the village of Lyster and the municipalities of Nelson and Ste. Anastasie-de-Nelson; and
 in the county of Arthabaska: the municipality of St. Louis-de-Blandford.

In 1966, it was defined as consisting of:
 the Towns of Arthabaska, Princeville, Victoriaville and Warwick;
in the County of Arthabaska: the village municipalities of Daveluyville and Norbertville; the parish municipalities of Saint-Albert-de-Warwick, Sainte-Anne-du-Sault, Saint-Christophe-d'Arthabaska, Sainte-Élisabeth-de-Warwick, Saint-Eusèbe-de-Stanfold, Saint-Louis-de-Blandford, Saint-Norbert-d'Arthabaska, Saint-Rosaire and Sainte-Victorie-d'Arthabaska; the township municipalities of Maddington and Warwick; the municipalities of Saint-Jacques-de-Horton and Saint-Valère;
 in the County of Lotbinière: the village municipalities of Deschaillons, Deschaillons-sur-Saint Laurent, Fortierville, Laurier-Station, Leclercville, Lotbinière, Sainte-Croix and Saint-Flavien; the parish municipalities of Notre-Dame-du-Sacré-Coeur-d'Issoudun, Saint-Antoine-de-Tilly, Sainte-Croix, Saint-Édouard-de-Lotbinière, Sainte-Emmélie, Saint-Flavien, Saint-Jacques-de-Parisville, Saint-Louis-de-Lotbinière, Saint-Octave-de-Dosquet and Sainte-Philomène-de-Fortierville; the municipalities of Sainte-Françoise, Saint-Janvier-de-Joly, Val-Alain and Villeroy; and
 in the County of Nicolet: the village municipalities of Aston-Junction, Les Becquets, Manseau, Sainte-Marie and Saint-Sylvère; the parish municipalities of Sainte-Cécile-de-Lévrard, Saint-Joseph-de-Blandford, Sainte-Marie-de-Blandford, Saint-Pierreles-Becquets, Saint-Raphaël south part, Saint-Samuel, Sainte-Sophie-de-Lévrard and Saint-Sylvère; the municipalities of Lemieux and Sainte-Eulalie.

In 1976, it was defined as consisting of:
 the Towns of Arthabaska, Princeville, Victoriaville and Warwick;
 in the County of Arthabaska: the village municipalities of Daveluyville and Norbertville; the parish municipalities of Saint-Albert-de-Warwick, Sainte-Anne-du-Sault, Saint-Christophe-d'Arthabaska, Sainte-Élisabeth-de-Warwick, Saint-Louis-de-Blandford, Saint-Norbert-d'Arthabaska, Saint Rosaire and Sainte-Victorie-d'Arthabaska; the township municipalities of Maddington and Warwick; the municipalities of Saint-Jacques-de-Horton and Saint-Valère;
 in the County of Lotbinière: the village municipalities of Deschaillons, Deschaillons-sur-Saint Laurent, Fortierville, Laurier-Station, Leclercville, Lotbinière, Sainte-Croix and Saint-Flavien; the parish municipalities of Notre-Dame-du-Sacré-Coeur-d'Issoudun, Saint-Antoine-de-Tilly, Sainte-Croix, Saint-Édouard-de-Lotbinière, Sainte-Emmélie, Saint-Flavien, Saint-Jacques-de-Parisville, Saint-Louis-de-Lotbinière, Saint-Octave-de-Dosquet and Sainte-Philomène-de-Fortierville; the municipalities of Saint-Apollinaire, Sainte-Françoise, Saint-Janvier-de-Joly, Val-Alain and Villeroy;
 in the County of Nicolet: the village municipalities of Aston-Junction, Les Becquets, Manseau, Sainte-Marie and Saint-Sylvère; the parish municipalities of Sainte-Cécile-de-Lévrard, Saint-Joseph-de-Blandford, Sainte-Marie-de-Blandford, Saint-Pierreles-Becquets, Saint-Raphaël (south part,) Saint-Samuel, Sainte-Sophie-de-Lévrard and Saint-Sylvère; the municipalities of Lemieux and Sainte-Eulalie.

In 1987, it was defined as consisting of:
the towns of Arthabaska, Princeville, Victoriaville and Warwick;
 the County of Arthabaska excluding the following: the parish municipalities of Saint-Rémi-de-Tangwick and Tingwick; the Township Municipality of Chester-Est; the municipalities of Chester-Nord, Chesterville and Trois-Lacs;
the County of Lotbinière excluding the following: the village municipalities of Sainte-Agathe and Saint-Sylvestre; the parish municipalities of Sainte-Agathe, Saint-Narcisse-de-Beaurivage and Saint-Sylvestre;
in the County of Drummond: the Village Municipality of Kingsey Falls; the municipality of Kingsey Falls;
 in the County of Nicolet: the village municipalities of Les Becauets and Manseau; the parish municipalities of Sainte-Cécile-de-Lévrard, Sainte-Sophie-de-Lévrard, Saint-Joseph-de-Blandford, Saint-Pierreles-Becquets and Saint-Samuel; the municipalities of Lemieux, Sainte-Eulalie, Sainte-Marie-de-Blandford and Saint-Sylvère.

In 1996, it was defined as consisting of:
 the cities of Plessisville and Princeville;
 the county regional municipalities of L'Érable and Lotbinière;
 the County Regional Municipality of Bécancour, excepting the City of Bécancour and Wôlinak Indian Reserve No. 11;
 in the County Regional Municipality of Arthabaska: the Village Municipality of Daveluyville; the parish municipalities of Saint-Louis-de-Blanford, Saint-Rosaire and Sainte-Anne-du-Sault; the Township Municipality of Maddington; the Municipality of Saint-Valère; and
 in the County Regional Municipality of Les Chutes-de-la-Chaudière: the Parish Municipality of Saint-Lambert-de-Lauzon.

Members of Parliament

This riding elected the following Members of Parliament:

Election results

Lotbinière

Lotbinière—L'Érable

See also 

 List of Canadian federal electoral districts
 Past Canadian electoral districts

External links

Riding history from the Library of Parliament:
Lotbinière
Lotbinière-L'Érable

Former federal electoral districts of Quebec